Thumper Nagasako (born April 13, 1983) is an American professional vert skater. He placed 13th in vert skating in 2003 and 8th in 2004 at the X Games.

References

External links
Official website
Hawaiian Extremes Sports Profile
thumpernagasako.com Thumper Nagasako Bio
skatelog.com

1983 births
Living people
Vert skaters
X Games athletes
Sportspeople from Hawaii
People from Wailuku, Hawaii